David or Dave Turner may refer to:

Politicians 
 David M. Turner (1917–2012), member of the Pennsylvania House of Representatives
 David Turner (politician) (born 1944), Canadian politician and academic
 David Howell Turner (1885–1957), politician from Alabama

Scientists 
 David W. Turner (born 1927), British physical chemist
 David G. Turner (born 1945), Canadian astronomer
 David H. Turner (born in 1940s), anthropologist at the University of Toronto
 David Turner (computer scientist) (born 1946), British computer scientist

Sportsmen 
 David Turner (rower) (1923–2015), American rower and Olympic gold medalist
 David Turner (cricketer) (born 1949), Hampshire cricketer
 Deacon Turner (David L. Turner, 1955–2011), former American football running back
 David Turner (Canadian football) (born 1967), defensive back and kick returner
 Dave Turner (footballer, born 1943) (born 1943), English midfielder for Brighton & Hove Albion, coach in Canada
 Dave Turner (footballer, born 1948) (born 1948), English full back for Southport

Others 
 David Turner (dramatist) (1927–1990), British dramatist
 David Turner (journalist) (born 1965), British businessman in publishing
 David Turner, co-author of software development library FreeType released in 1996
 David B. Turner, who attempted a murder-suicide at Dow High School, Michigan, in 2007
 David Turner (Neighbours), fictional character on the Australian soap opera Neighbours
 Dave Turner (Degrassi), fictional character in the Canadian teen drama Degrassi: The Next Generation